The Shire of Bruce Rock is a local government area in the Wheatbelt region of Western Australia, about  south of Merredin and about  east of the state capital, Perth.

History
Bruce Rock was initially constituted as the East Avon Road District in 1913. In 1918, it was renamed to Bruce Rock, and on 1 July 1961, it became a shire following the enactment of the Local Government Act 1960. In 1999, the Ardath, Babakin, Kwolyin, Shackleton, Belka and Coordarin wards covering outlying areas of the Shire were replaced by 2-member South, West and East Wards, while the Central and Town wards covered other areas. Wards were abolished for the 2005 elections.

Wards
The Shire is no longer divided into wards and the eleven councillors represent the entire Shire.

Towns and localities
The towns and localities of the Shire of Bruce Rock with population and size figures based on the most recent Australian census:

Former towns
 Belka
 Erikin

Population

Heritage-listed places

As of 2023, 210 places are heritage-listed in the Shire of Bruce Rock, of which four are on the State Register of Heritage Places.

References

External links

 

 
Bruce Rock